Tahlia Beverly Wilson (born 21 October 1999) is an Australian cricketer who plays for the New South Wales Breakers in the Women's National Cricket League and the Sydney Thunder in the Women's Big Bash League. She played her debut season in 2018-19 for the Sydney Sixers, whilst in Year 12 completing her HSC at St Joseph's Catholic High School as a 19-year-old. She is a wicketkeeper-batter, who has also played for Australia's under 19 teams, and was awarded the McDonald’s Women’s Premier Cricket Player of the Year for her 471 runs at an average of 235.5.

References

External links

Tahlia Wilson at Cricket Australia

Living people
1999 births
Cricketers from New South Wales
Australian women cricketers
Auckland Hearts cricketers
New South Wales Breakers cricketers
Sydney Thunder (WBBL) cricketers
Sydney Sixers (WBBL) cricketers